Krachi may refer to;

Krachi West District, an administrative unit of Ghana
Kete Krachi, a town in Krachi West District
Krachi East District, an administrative unit of Ghana
Krachi West (Ghana parliament constituency), a constituency in Ghana
Krachi East (Ghana parliament constituency), a constituency in Ghana
Krachi language, spoken in Ghana

See also
Karachi (disambiguation)
 Crachi, a brand of chocolate
 Kratié (disambiguation), places in Cambodia